Gramatthu Minnal is a 1987 Indian Tamil-language drama film directed by K. Rangaraj, starring Ramarajan and Revathi. It was released on 18 December 1987, and ran for 100 days.

Plot

Cast 

Ramarajan as Selvarasu
Revathi as Valli Mayilu
Goundamani
Raja
Senthamarai
S. N. Lakshmi as Ponnatha

Soundtrack 
The soundtrack was composed by Ilaiyaraaja.

Reception 
NKS of The Indian Express wrote, "The film comes as a flashback, the climax contrasting with the overall placidity of the narrative".

References

External links 
 

1980s Tamil-language films
1987 drama films
1987 films
Films directed by K. Rangaraj
Films scored by Ilaiyaraaja
Indian drama films